is a junction railway station located in Sakai-ku, Sakai, Osaka, Japan. It is jointly operated by the West Japan Railway Company (JR West) and the private railway operator Nankai Electric Railway.

Lines

Station layout
The station consists of two sets of opposed side platform pairs connected in each case by elevated station buildings. The stations are both staffed.

Platforms
Nankai Railway

JR West

Adjacent stations

History
Mikunigaoka Station opened on 15 February 1942. With the privatization of the Japan National Railways (JNR) on 1 April 1987, the former JNR portion of the station came under the aegis of the West Japan Railway Company.

Station numbering was introduced on the Hanwa Line in March 2018 with the its platforms being assigned station number JR-R29.

Passenger statistics
In fiscal 2019, the Nankai station was used by an average of 40,650 passengers daily. The JR portion of the station was used by 24,227 passengers (boarding only) during the same period.

Surrounding area
 Mozu Tombs
 Sakai City Sakai High School

See also
List of railway stations in Japan

References

External links

  
 Nankai station information 

Railway stations in Osaka Prefecture
Stations of West Japan Railway Company
Railway stations in Japan opened in 1942
Sakai, Osaka